El Hadji Arfang Gueye (born 20 August 1999) is a Senegalese professional footballer who plays as a centre-back.

References 

1999 births
Living people
Senegalese footballers
Association football central defenders
Lille OSC players
Royal Excel Mouscron players
Championnat National 2 players
Belgian Pro League players
Challenger Pro League players
Senegalese expatriate footballers
Expatriate footballers in France
Expatriate footballers in Belgium
Senegalese expatriate sportspeople in France
Senegalese expatriate sportspeople in Belgium